The following is a detailed list of results and scores from National Football League games aired on NFL Network's NFL Network Exclusive Game Series.

Results by season
Listed below are games and their respective results played from 2006 to the present.

Schedule (Prior to NFL Network Special branding)

2006 Season

2007 Season

2008 Season

2009 Season

2010 Season

2011 Season

2013 Season

2014 season

2015 season

2016 season

Schedule (As NFL Network Special)

2017 season

2018 season

2019 season

2020 season

2021 season

Schedule (As NFL Network Exclusive Game Series)

2022 season

See also
 NFL Network Thursday Night Football results (2006–present)
 NFL Network Special
 Thursday Night Football

References
NFL Network Official Website
NFL.com/Live – NFL Network Run to the Playoffs Online Broadcast

2000s in American television
2000s in North American sport
2000s television-related lists
2010s in American television
2010s in North American sport
2010s television-related lists
2020s in American television
2020s in North American sport
2020s-related lists
National Football League on television results